Capira   is a town and corregimiento in Capira District, Panamá Oeste Province, Panama with a population of 5,181 as of 2010. It is the seat of Capira District. Its population as of 1990 was 3,606; its population as of 2000 was 4,553.

References

Corregimientos of Panamá Oeste Province
Populated places in Panamá Oeste Province